Auguste Alburt Prudent Detœuf (6 August 1883 – 11 April 1947) was a French economist, essayist, and industrialist.

1883 births
1947 deaths
20th-century French economists
École Polytechnique alumni
French industrialists
People of the French Third Republic
French male essayists
20th-century French essayists
20th-century French male writers

Boris Lifschitz remembers, in the preface of his book Stalin, that Detoeuf was the one who persuaded the owner of Plon Maurice Bourdel  to pubblicate the book that had the ostracism of french communist party (Boris Souvarin, Stalin, Adelphi editor Milano, Prefazione).